The SIA 7B was a biplane reconnaissance-bomber built by the Società Italiana Aviazione and served with the Italian Corpo Aeronautico Militare and American Expeditionary Force in 1917.

Development
The engineers, Torretta and Carlo Maurilio Lerici of the Fiat company, designed the airplane as a "Jack of all trades", its speed, climbing power, and carrying capacity enabled it to be used as a bomber and racer. It was built in the workshops of the Societa Italiano Aviazione, a sister company to the famous motor-car firm F.I.A.T. of Turin. It used the standard Italian structural feature of a plywood-covered fuselage.

The SIA.7B was accepted for the Italian Air Force in November 1917 and entered mass production. There were however revealed its shortcomings, like low wing structure durability and poor view. Next variant SIA.7B2, developed in December 1917, had strengthened wings, slightly raised cockpits and stronger engine.  Another variant, built in February 1918, was the SIA 9 with stronger 700 hp engine. There were built 501 SIA.7B, 71 SIA.7B2 and 62 SIA.9B.

Operational history
The SIA.7 family aircraft were used for reconnaissance and bombing raids on Austro-Italian front. The SIA.7B2 entered service in March 1918. The SIA.9 managed to take part in World War I service as well. Because of unsatisfactory durability, from July 1918 SIA.7B and 7В2 were moved to training units.

In 1917, the Italian government sent a pair of SIA 7B-1 aircraft to the United States for evaluation under a plan to mass-produce established European designs. The 7B-1 was not put into production in the US but 19 were bought in Italy for use by A.E.F. units sent there.

Variants

SIA 7B1 main reconnaissance-bomber variant
SIA 7B2 improved reconnaissance-bomber variant
SIA R2 scout-bomber built in 1918, span 12.32 m (40 ft 5 in), length 8.75 M (28 ft 8 in), height 3.3 m (120 ft 10 in), speed 180 km/h (111.8 mph)
SIA 9B two-seat reconnaissance-bomber 700 hp (522 kW) Fiat A.14 engine

Operators

Corpo Aeronautico Militare

American Expeditionary Forces received 19 7B-1 in February 1917, used at Foggia, Italy.

Specifications (7B)

See also
 List of military aircraft of the United States

References

Further reading

External links

SIA.7(9) at Ugolok Neba 

1910s Italian military reconnaissance aircraft
Military aircraft of World War I
Aircraft first flown in 1917
Biplanes
Single-engined tractor aircraft